The Black River is located in Northumberland County, New Brunswick in Canada.

See also
List of rivers of New Brunswick

Landforms of Northumberland County, New Brunswick
Rivers of New Brunswick